The Hayner Ranch Formation is a geologic formation found near the San Diego Mountains of New Mexico. It is estimated to have been deposited during the Miocene epoch.

Description
It is the lowest formation of the Santa Fe Group in the San Diego Mountains area, overlying older volcanic rock of the Spears Group. The formation fills paleovalleys eroded in the underlying volcanic beds.

The formation is particularly well exposed in a half graben between the East and West Selden Hills; in Selden Canyon to the west; at its type section in the Tonuco Uplift; and in the Rincon Hills to the north, where it is coarser (including boulder conglomerates) and partially silicified. The formation is interpreted as stream and floodplain deposits near the axis of a broad closed basin. Study of the formation and others in the area support at least four episodes of block faulting starting 35 million years ago, almost all along faults trending north–south.

The formation records the unroofing of the Caballo Mountains. Clasts in the lower part of the formation are derived from the underlying Spears Group and those higher in the formation from the Eocene Palm Park and Love Ranch Formations. However, clasts from the Doña Ana Mountains are absent from the formation, showing that these mountains had not yet been unroofed during deposition of the formation.

The formation has been studied as a model for the critical early stages of diagenesis of continental red beds of Pennsylvanian to Triassic age. and as a model for diagenesis in the Santa Fe Group.

History of investigation
The formation was first defined by Seager et al. in 1971, and assigned to the Santa Fe Group.

Footnotes

References
 
 
 
 
 
 
 

Neogene formations of New Mexico